Kamil Juraszek (born 26 March 1991) is a Polish footballer who plays for Lechia Dzierżoniów.

References

External links
Kamil Juraszek at 90 minut

Polish footballers
1991 births
Living people
Association football defenders
Polonia Świdnica players
Śląsk Wrocław players
Arka Gdynia players
Bytovia Bytów players
ŁKS Łódź players
Chrobry Głogów players
Ekstraklasa players
I liga players
II liga players
III liga players